Álvaro Lloreda Caicedo (15 October 1903 — 10 April 1985) was a Colombian industrialist, newspaper publisher, and politician. In 1949 Lloreda, along with his brothers Mario and Alfredo, founded the newspaper El País, which continues in print today. He was director of the newspaper for 25 years.

A Conservative party politician, he was elected as Mayor of his hometown of Santiago de Cali. Next he was elected to the Congress of Colombia, serving in both the Chamber of Representatives and the Senate.  

In 1974, he was appointed Ambassador of Colombia to Spain.

Personal life
He married Mercedes Caicedo de Lloreda of Costa Rica. They had three children together: Elvira, Álvaro Jose and Rodrigo Lloreda Caicedo. His younger son followed him into the newspaper business and politics.

Legacy and honors
In 1985 after Lloreda's death, the city of Santiago de Cali issued a decree in his honor for his many contributions to the community.

References

1903 births
1985 deaths
Alvaro
People from Cali
Colombian Conservative Party politicians
Newspaper founders
Mayors of Cali
Members of the Senate of Colombia
Members of the Chamber of Representatives of Colombia
Ambassadors of Colombia to Spain